Sagil is a small settlement in Tangkak District, Johor, Malaysia. Sagil is near the border of Johor with Malacca. Air Panas Waterfall is located here, and to access to the peak of Gunung Ledang. Gunung Ledang is around 5 minute driving distance from Sagil town.

There are various villages here, such as:
 Kampung Sagil Parit Satu
 Kampung Sagil Parit Dua
 Kampung Sagil Parit Tiga
 Kampung Konggo
 Kampung Melayu Raya
 Kampung Hang Tuah
 Kampung Melepang

Location 
Sagil is a small area located between Bandar Segamat and Bandar Tangkak. From Plaza Tol Tangkak, it takes a 13.4 km distance and from Plaza tol Bukit Gambir, it takes 15 km distance. Sagil is located in Parlimen Ledang (P144) under YB Syed Ibrahim Syed Noh and Dun Gambir under YAB Tan Sri Muhyiddin Bin Hj Muhammad Yassin.

Education 
Here there are a variety of types of schools and college:

Primary school:
 SK Sagil Kampung
 SK Puteri Ledang, Sagil
 SJK(C) Chee Chuin
 SJK(T) Ladang Sagil
Secondary school:
 SMK Sagil, Tangkak
Colleges:
 Institut Latihan Perindustrian Tangkak
All schools here administered under PPD Tangkak.(Ledang District Education Office was established on December 1, 2014).

Towns in Johor
Towns, suburbs and villages in Muar
Muar District